Hindustan Aeronautics Limited S.C. is an Indian association football club based in Bangalore. The club was formed in 2006.

HAL have never won the League championship, and the Federation Cup.

Key

 P = Played
 W = Games won
 D = Games drawn
 L = Games lost
 F = Goals for
 A = Goals against
 Pts = Points
 Pos = Final position

 IL = I-League
 IL2 = I-League 2nd Division
 DNP = Did not play

 F = Final
 Group = Group stage
 R16 = Round of 16
 QF = Quarter-finals

 R1 = Round 1
 R2 = Round 2
 R3 = Round 3
 R4 = Round 4
 R5 = Round 5
 R6 = Round 6
 SF = Semi-finals

Seasons

Seasons
Hindustan Aeronautics Limited
Hindustan Aeronautics Limited